Luciano Bartoli (17 October 1946 – 1 February 2019) was  an Italian actor.

Biography
Bartoli began his film career in 1967, at the age of 21, starring in Pier Paolo Pasolini's Oedipus Rex, while during the 1970s and the 1980s he alternated performances in some B movies and several roles in films directed by authors such as Marco Bellocchio, Citto Maselli and Giuseppe Tornatore.

Partial filmography

 Oedipus Rex (1967)
 The Fifth Cord (1971)
 The Violent Professionals (1973)
 Torso (1973)
 The Suspect (1975)
 Antonio Gramsci: The Days of Prison (1977)
 Lion of the Desert (1981)
 Henry IV (1984)
 The Inquiry (1986)
 Il camorrista (1986)
 The Moro Affair (1987)
 Traces of an Amorous Life (1990)
 The Amusements of Private Life (1990)
 Chimera (2001)
 Heaven (2002)
 In Your Hands (2007)

References

External links
 

1946 births
Living people
Italian male film actors
20th-century Italian male actors
21st-century Italian male actors